Himanshu Chawla (born 31 May 1991) is an Indian first-class cricketer who plays for Punjab.

References

External links
 

1991 births
Living people
Indian cricketers
Punjab, India cricketers
Cricketers from Delhi